White Youth is a 1920 American silent drama film directed by Norman Dawn and starring Edith Roberts, Alfred Hollingsworth, Thomas Jefferson, Arnold Gray, and Hattie Peters. The film was released by Universal Film Manufacturing Company in December 1920.

Cast
Edith Roberts as Aline Ann Belame
Alfred Hollingsworth as Gen. Belame
Thomas Jefferson as Frangois Cayetane
Arnold Gray as Burton Striker (as Arnold Gregg)
Hattie Peters as Calalou
Lucas C. Luke as Butler
Joseph Belmont as Monsieur Le Moyne (as Baldy Belmont)
Phyllis Allen as Madame Le Moyne
Olga D. Mojean as Madame La Roche
Sam Konnella as Pierre
Alida B. Jones as Madame Martin (as Alida D. Jones)
Gertrude Pedlar as Mother Superior

Preservation
The film is now considered lost.

References

External links

1920 drama films
Silent American drama films
American silent feature films
American black-and-white films
Universal Pictures films
Lost American films
1920 lost films
Lost drama films
Films directed by Norman Dawn
1920s American films
1920s English-language films